The University of Illinois College of Medicine offers a four-year program leading to the MD degree at four different sites in Illinois: Chicago, Peoria, Rockford, and formerly Urbana–Champaign. The Urbana–Champaign site stopped accepting new students after Fall 2016 to make room for the newly established Carle Illinois College of Medicine.

In 2011, enrollment of medical students in the University of Illinois system totaled 1,290 according to the Association of American Medical Colleges.

History
The College of Medicine, originally an independent institution, opened on September 26, 1882, as the College of Physicians and Surgeons of Chicago (P&S) with 100 students and a faculty of 30. Five years later, the Board of Trustees of the University of Illinois approved a contract of affiliation whereby the university would lease P&S as its Department of Medicine. The arrangement continued until 1912, when there was a nine-month hiatus in the affiliation owing to a lack of legislative support. It was only after the faculty and alumni of P&S bought up all shares of the school's stock and presented them to the Board of Trustees as a gift that the school officially became the College of Medicine of the University of Illinois in March 1913.

In the late 1800s, although six medical schools were already in existence, five physicians—Charles Warrington Earle, Abraham Reeves Jackson, Daniel Atkinson King Steele, Samuel McWilliams and Leonard St. John—decided to open their own proprietary medical school. They pooled together $5,541.78, purchased a piece of land and secured a certificate of incorporation. The new school, located on Harrison and Honore streets, was named the College of Physicians and Surgeons of Chicago (commonly referred to as P&S). Its doors opened on September 26, 1882, with a class of 100 students and a faculty of 27 physicians.

At the West Side Free Dispensary, located on the first floor of the medical school, students in small groups could observe pathological cases and their treatment. Patients were classified according to the affected area or system of the body: heart, lungs, eyes, ears, skin or nervous system. The dispensary also furnished material for college clinics in medicine, surgery, gynecology, obstetrics, ophthalmology, neurology and pediatrics. In its first three years, the dispensary registered 20,353 patients and dispensed 17,347 prescriptions. 
In 1913, after years of negotiations, the P&S faculty and alumni donated stock to the University of  Illinois Board of Trustees to establish the University of Illinois College of Medicine. In 1970, the Illinois legislature voted to expand the college to three additional sites: Peoria, Rockford and Urbana. Their purpose was to provide access to care for all citizens in the state and increase opportunities for Illinois residents to attend medical school.

Present status
The College of Medicine has a faculty of approximately 4,000 across the four sites.

The surrounding health science center, of which the University of Illinois at Chicago College of Medicine is a part, also comprises the University of Illinois Medical Center,  the colleges of Nursing, Pharmacy, Dentistry, and Applied Health Sciences, and the School of Public Health.

Campuses
Chicago Campus
Surrounded by the four hospitals of Chicago's large Illinois Medical District, medical students on at this campus get early clinical experience. All students accompany physicians on rounds and learn to take patient histories starting in their first year. Fifty-three residency programs are available.

In addition to serving as the Chicago program site, the Chicago campus of the College of Medicine is the administrative home for the dean and all other college-wide officers. Located on the Near West Side, the college is part of the University of Illinois Medical Center, which includes the colleges of Applied Health Sciences, Dentistry, Nursing, Pharmacy, and the School of Public Health.

The College of Medicine's Chicago campus sits on a plot of land once occupied by West Side Park, the former home of the Chicago Cubs.

Peoria Campus
In Peoria, first through fourth-year students get clinical experience at Methodist Medical Center of Illinois, OSF Saint Francis Medical Center, Children’s Hospital of Illinois - the busiest pediatric hospital in central Illinois -  Pekin Hospital, and Proctor Community Hospital.

Rockford Campus
The Rockford campus includes the Center for Rural Health Professions, which works to improve health and healthcare in rural communities. Rockford teaches first through fourth year medical students and offers a family medicine residency program.

Urbana Campus
This campus will be closed in 2022 to make room for the Carle Illinois College of Medicine. This extension is on the Urbana-Champaign campus of the University of Illinois and offers student education and research opportunities that includes collaboration with colleagues across campus. Urbana also hosts the dual-degree Medical Scholars Program.

Curriculum

The College of Medicine offers a Doctor of Medicine degree program (M.D.), a Doctor of Philosophy (Ph.D.) degree program in the medical sciences, and three joint degree programs: MD/PhD, MD/MPH, and MD/MBA. Other advanced degree programs in the medical sciences include a master of science degree in medical biotechnology (MBT; Rockford), a master of science in medical physiology (MSMP, Chicago), a master of health professions education degree (MHPE; Chicago/online), and a master of science degree in patient safety leadership (MPSL; online).

Reputation and rankings
Among the school's  alumni are: U.S. Representative James A. McDermott, ’63, and Olga Jonasson, ’58, a pioneer in kidney transplantation.
 1 in 6 Illinois physicians are trained at the University of Illinois 
 UI College of Medicine is ranked #25 by the NIH ranking based on amount of funding.
 UI College of Medicine is currently ranked #55 among research based medical schools in the 2021 edition of U.S. News & World Report.
UI College of medicine ranks #1 for Hispanic graduates and #5 for African American graduates according to the “Top 100 Producers” ranking for 2008, Diverse Issues in Higher Education.
 UI College of Medicine is ranked #2 in the nation for enrollment of Hispanic medical students according to the "Top 25 Medical School Enrolling Hispanics" ranking.
 UI College of Medicine is currently ranked within the “top 10 medical schools for Hispanic students” by the Hispanic Business Magazine 2013.
 UI College of Medicine is currently the third largest medical school in the country. Its 1,351 students hail from a wide variety of cultural and economic backgrounds serving as a vast network of future leaders in health care and medicine.
75 residencies are available in a wide variety of fields on the four campuses. From emergency medicine in Chicago to family practice in Peoria, internal medicine in Urbana, and rural medicine in Rockford, students can choose from a wide variety of specialties.
 The college’s faculty conducts groundbreaking research in many fields. Advancements include the development of a vaccine against prostate cancer, transplantation of pancreatic islet cells to cure Type I diabetes and more.

Notable alumni
 Riad Barmada (MD 1963) — Head of orthopedics at University of Illinois at Chicago College of Medicine (1984–1998)
 Georges C. Benjamin (MD 1978) — Executive director of the American Public Health Association
 Isabella Garnett (MD 1901) — Founder and superintendent of Evanston's Community Hospital
 Charles Hirsch (MD 1958) — New York City Chief Medical Examiner
 Donald Jensen (MD 1972) —  Hepatitis C researcher, clinician, and Richard B. Capps Chair Emeritus, Rush University Medical Center.
 W. Dudley Johnson (MD 1955) — Cardiac surgeon known as the father of coronary artery bypass surgery
 Olga Jonasson (MD 1958) — Chief of surgery at Cook County Hospital (1977); first woman to chair an academic department of surgery (Ohio State University, 1987)
 Terry Mason (MD 1978) — Physician and director of Chicago Board of Health
 Jim McDermott (MD 1963) — U.S. Representative (D-WA) (1989–2016)
 Julius B. Richmond (MD 1939) — Physician and founder of the Head Start Program; former U.S. Surgeon General

Notable faculty
Nathaniel Oglesby Calloway, Professor — First African American to receive their PhD from an institute west of the Mississippi River
Ananda Chakrabarty, Professor, 1979–2020 (Chicago) — Development and patent of a genetically engineered Pseudomonas bacterium
 Paul Lauterbur, Professor, 1985–1990 (Chicago), 1985–2007 (Urbana-Champaign) — Nobel Prize in Physiology or Medicine in 2003 for development of MRI

See also
University of Illinois Hospital & Health Sciences System

References

External links
  The University of Illinois at Chicago College of Medicine — official website
 Chicago campus website
 Peoria campus website
 Rockford campus website
 Urbana campus website
  Composite images of the graduating classes - digital images from the UIC Library collections

Educational institutions established in 1882
Medical schools in Illinois
Medicine, College of
University of Illinois College of Medicine
University of Illinois College of Medicine
1882 establishments in Illinois